Kristin Midthun (born February 4, 1961 in Oslo) is a Norwegian team handball player and Olympic medalist. She received a silver medal at the 1988 Summer Olympics in Seoul with the Norwegian national team. Kristin Midthun played 143 games for the national team during her career, scoring 306 goals.

References

External links

1961 births
Living people
Norwegian female handball players
Olympic silver medalists for Norway
Olympic medalists in handball
Medalists at the 1988 Summer Olympics
Handball players at the 1988 Summer Olympics
Handball players from Oslo